"Something Big" is a pop song by Canadian singer Shawn Mendes from his debut studio album Handwritten (2015). It was released on 7 November 2014 as the second official single from the album. The song peaked at number 80 on the US Billboard Hot 100.

Music video
The music video for "Something Big" was released on 11 November 2014. It was filmed in Bison Run Rd, in Brampton, Ontario.

Chart performance
The song debuted on the Billboard Hot 100 chart of 22 November 2014, at number 92. The song re-entered on chart on 10 January 2015, at number 92, and eventually the song came to number 80 on 17 January 2015.

Charts

Weekly charts

Year-end charts

Certifications

Release history

References

2014 singles
2014 songs
Shawn Mendes songs
Songs written by Scott Harris (songwriter)
Songs written by Shawn Mendes
Songs written by Ido Zmishlany
Island Records singles